A homily (from Greek ὁμιλία, homilía) is a commentary that follows a reading of scripture, giving the "public explanation of a sacred doctrine" or text. The works of Origen and John Chrysostom (known as Paschal Homily) are considered exemplary forms of Christian homily.

In Catholic, Anglican, Lutheran, and Eastern Orthodox churches, a homily is usually given during Mass (Divine Liturgy or Holy Qurbana for Orthodox and Eastern Catholic Churches, and Divine Service for the Lutheran Church) at the end of the Liturgy of the Word. Many people consider it synonymous with a sermon.

The English word homily is derived from the Ancient Greek word ὁμιλία homilia, which means intercourse or interaction with other people (derived from the word homilos, meaning "a gathering"). The word later came to have a more technical sense. According to The Catholic Encyclopedia, Origen was the first to distinguish between logos (sermo) and homilia (tractatus).

Roman Catholic Mass homily
The General Instruction of the Roman Missal (GIRM), the official document governing the celebration of Mass, states that:

Other senses 
Contemporary Protestant clergy often use the term 'homily' to describe a short sermon, such as one created for a wedding or funeral.

In colloquial, non-religious, usage, homily often means a sermon concerning a practical matter, a moralizing lecture or admonition, or an inspirational saying or platitude, but sermon is the more appropriate word in these cases.

See also
 Homiliarium
 Homiletics
 Postil
 Dharma talk
 D'var Torah

Footnotes

Bibliography 

 Origen. (2010). Homilies on Leviticus, 1-16. United States: Catholic University of America Press.
 Marriott, C., Chrysostom, J., Morris, J. B. (2015). The Homilies of S. John Chrysostom, Archbishop of Constantinople, on the Epistle of St. Paul the Apostle to the Romans - Scholar's Choice Edition. United Kingdom: Creative Media Partners, LLC.
 St. John Chrysostom commentary on the Psalms. (1998). United States: Holy Cross Orthodox Press.
 Instructions to Preachers from "Sermons for all the Sundays in the year", Dublin : Duffy (1882) by Alphonsus Liguori

External links
www.bibleinterpretation.org Bible Interpretation by Rev. Abraham Mutholath in English.
www.biblereflection.org Bible Interpretation with reflection by Rev. Abraham Mutholath in English.
www.christianhomily.com Sunday and Feast Homily Resources in English and Homily Videos in Malayalam by Fr. Abraham Mutholath
Homily Videos in Malayalam by Fr. Abraham Mutholath
Daily Homilies Website
Read Malayalam and English Homilies, Reflections and Talks By Archbishop Soosa Pakiam, Metropolitan Archdiocese of Trivandrum
2002 General Instruction of the Roman Missal – England and Wales edition (pdf)

Christian genres
Christian sermons
Christian terminology
Homiletics